Order of the Phoenix may refer to:

Order of the Phoenix (Greece), a medal conferred on Greek or foreign citizens 
 Royal Order of the Phoenix (Tonga), a knighthood order of the Kingdom of Tonga, founded in 2010 
Various uses related to the Harry Potter series
Harry Potter and the Order of the Phoenix, the fifth novel in the Harry Potter series by J. K. Rowling
Harry Potter and the Order of the Phoenix (film), a film based on the novel
Harry Potter and the Order of the Phoenix (soundtrack), the soundtrack to the film
Harry Potter and the Order of the Phoenix (video game), the video game based on the film and novel
Order of the Phoenix (fictional organisation), a fictional organisation in the Harry Potter series
A secret organization of psychic rebels in Rebels of the Red Planet (1961) by Charles L. Fontenay

See also 
"The Sect of the Phoenix", a short story by Jorge Luis Borges